Siyabulela Mdaka (born 14 February 1988 in Mthatha) is a South African rugby union player who last played for the Leopards (rugby union) in the Currie Cup and in the Rugby Challenge. His regular position is flanker.

Career

Youth and Varsity rugby

He played for Border Country Districts at the 2004 Under-16 Grant Khomo Week competition before moving to Durban, where he played for Natal at the 2006 Under-18 Academy Week tournament. He progressed through the  academy system and played for the  side in 2007 and the  side in 2008 and 2009.

In 2010, he moved to Potchefstroom, where he represented local university side  in the Varsity Cup competition in 2010, 2011 and 2012, making twenty appearances in total.

Leopards

He made one more start, as well as two substitute appearances during that competition.

Border Bulldogs

After the conclusion of the 2012 Varsity Cup competition, Mdaka returned to the Eastern Cape and joined First Division strugglers . He made three appearances for them during the 2012 Currie Cup First Division and was a regular in 2013, making six appearances in the 2013 Vodacom Cup and twelve in the 2013 Currie Cup First Division.

References

South African rugby union players
Living people
1988 births
People from Mthatha
Border Bulldogs players
Leopards (rugby union) players
Southern Kings players
Eastern Province Elephants players
CS Dinamo București (rugby union) players
Rugby union flankers
Rugby union players from the Eastern Cape